21 is the second studio album by American R&B singer Omarion. It was released on December 12, 2006, by Epic Records and Sony Urban Music. The album was produced by Timbaland, The Neptunes, Eric Hudson and Bryan-Michael Cox and saw Omarion co-write every song on the album. The album's title was inspired from when Omarion turned 21 years old months before the album's release.

The album spawned two singles: "Entourage" and "Ice Box". Exclusively at Walmart, 21 was packaged with a bonus DVD titled BET Presents Omarion (2006). The DVD features BET and performance highlights, and music videos from Omarion's solo career. 21 also received mildly positive reviews from critics, who saw it as an improvement over his debut record O (2005). The album debuted at number one on the US Billboard 200, selling 119,000 copies in its first week.

The European edition add a bonus track: "Man Up", featuring Korean singer Rain.

Critical reception

21 received mildly positive reviews from music critics. Andy Kellman of AllMusic gave it an "Album Pick" title, praising the production throughout and Omarion for putting more input as a songwriter and performer, saying that he "truly surpassed his status as the former member of a boy band." DJ Z of DJBooth commented on the lyricism feeling mature and the production showing more sophistication, saying that "Omarion's second album is a welcome addition to his musical catalog and should appeal to both his fan base and a more adult crowd." Thomas Inskeep of Stylus Magazine also praised the album for its production and having a good ratio of solid-to-great songs. Putting it alongside Ciara's The Evolution for "best straight-up R&B album" he said that "the pair leave plenty of encouragement about the future of the genre."

Damien Scott of Vibe gave a mixed review, saying that Omarion lacked range in his performance and that he's "never fully in charge." Mark Edward Nero of About.com was also mixed towards the album, praising the first two singles but found the other tracks above-average at best, in terms of production and vocal quality that "range from average ("Obsession," Made For TV,") to fair ("Midnight," "Beg For It")." He concluded with: "Although O's taken a step forward in establishing himself as an adult solo artist, he still hasn't completely arrived yet. But at only 21 years of age, he's still got plenty of room to grow."

Commercial performance
The album debuted at number one on the US Billboard 200, selling 119,000 copies in its first week.  This became Omarion's first US number one debut and his second US top-ten album. In its second week, the album dropped to number ten on the chart, selling an additional 42,000 copies. As of November 2008, the album has sold over 390,000 copies in the United States.

Track listing 

Notes
 signifies a co-producer

Personnel 
Adapted from the 21 liner notes.

 Chris Stokes, Omari Grandberry, Kawan 'KP' Prather, Ketrina 'Taz' Askew, Marques Houston and Henley 'Jr.' Regisford: executive producers
 Brian "Big Bass" Gardner: mastering (Bernie Grundman Mastering, Hollywood, CA)
 Chris "Tek" O'Ryan: sound engineer
 The Ultimate Group: management
 Kenny Meiselas, Esq. (Grubman, Indursky, PC) and Tabetha D. Plummer, Esq. (The Plummer Law Group): legal representation
 Kawan Prather: A&R, Sony Urban Music
 Jennifer Gray: A&R Operations, Sony Urban Music
 David "Touch" Wright: A&R Coordinator, Sony Urban Music
 Amberdawn Alexander: marketing, Sony Urban Music
 Michelle Holme and Erwin Gorostiza: art direction
 Eric Ogden: photography

Charts

Weekly charts

Year-end charts

See also
 List of Billboard 200 number-one albums of 2007
 List of Billboard number-one R&B albums of 2007

References

2006 albums
Omarion albums
Epic Records albums
Sony Urban Music albums
Albums produced by Bryan-Michael Cox
Albums produced by Eric Hudson
Albums produced by Timbaland
Albums produced by the Neptunes
Albums produced by the Underdogs (production team)
Albums recorded at Record Plant (Los Angeles)